The Liquidator is a Canadian reality television series that aired on the Canadian specialty channel OLN. The series was filmed in and around Vancouver, British Columbia and was produced by Anaid Productions.  It was cancelled in 2016.

The Liquidator originally premiered on July 5, 2012 on OLN. For its third season, the series expanded to 26 episodes, up from 13 episodes in each of the two previous seasons, and also featured additional cities across Canada. The series has since been extended to a total of 39 episodes for season 4. Production on the 39-episode season completed and premiered on OLN in fall 2015.

Summary 
The Liquidator follows the daily life of Jeff Schwarz, the star of the series, as he buys and sells discarded or unwanted merchandise.  The series focuses on Jeff's negotiating (or "haggling") skills as he hunts for bargains and tries to get the lowest possible price on merchandise. Jeff follows leads and negotiates deals for the merchandise which is then sold by him and his staff at Direct Liquidation, a 30,000-square-foot warehouse in Burnaby, British Columbia which is owned and operated by Jeff and his wife, or in some cases through an auction.

International broadcast 

The Liquidator was acquired by Discovery International for its DMAX channels in Europe. The series is now available via the Discovery channel in various countries across Europe, including the UK, Spain, Portugal, the Netherlands, Belgium, Sweden, Finland, Norway, Denmark, Italy, France, Russia, and in Israel.

Episode list

Season 1: 2012

Season 2: 2012-2013

Season 3: 2013-2014

Season 4: 2015

External links

References 

2010s Canadian reality television series
2012 Canadian television series debuts
2015 Canadian television series endings
OLN original programming
Television shows filmed in Vancouver